Ruslan Vladimirovich Albegov (born 26 January 1988 in Vladikavkaz) is a Russian weightlifter competing in the +105 kg category. He won the bronze medal at the 2012 Summer Olympics in the men's +105 kg event with a combined total of 448 kg (snatch-208 kg, clean and jerk-240 kg).

Ruslan Albegov has been banned from the Games in Rio de Janeiro because of entire ban of Russian Weightlifting team.

Major results

References

External links
 
 
 
 

1988 births
Living people
Russian male weightlifters
Olympic weightlifters of Russia
Weightlifters at the 2012 Summer Olympics
Olympic bronze medalists for Russia
Olympic medalists in weightlifting
Medalists at the 2012 Summer Olympics
World Weightlifting Championships medalists
Universiade medalists in weightlifting
Universiade gold medalists for Russia
European Weightlifting Championships medalists
Medalists at the 2013 Summer Universiade
Sportspeople from Vladikavkaz
20th-century Russian people
21st-century Russian people